Illex, commonly known as shortfin squids, is a squid genus in the family Ommastrephidae and the only member of the subfamily Illicinae. It contains four species:
 Illex argentinus, Argentine shortfin squid
 Illex coindetii, southern shortfin squid
 Illex illecebrosus, northern shortfin squid
 Illex oxygonius, sharptail shortfin squid

References

External links

Squid
Cephalopod genera